Aberdeen floating village is located at the Aberdeen Harbour in the Southern District of Hong Kong. The harbour is known to contain 600 junks and is home to 6,000 people.

Aberdeen 
Since the 19th century, Aberdeen has emerged as one of the most important fishing ports in Hong Kong. In the 1990s and 2000s, the population of the Aberdeen Floating Village community decreased due both to the rapid development of fisheries in the Guangdong Province and the increase in operating costs of the fishing industry in Hong Kong.

Presently, the majority of the boat people do not permanently live in their boats. Rather, most simply use the boat to fish during the day. Most of the descendants of the floating people have chosen to relocate to high-rise accommodations on dry land.

Prior to the 1950s, salt fish was the major catch sold at Aberdeen. Today, Aberdeen is the only fishing port in the Southern District in Hong Kong. It continues to play an important role in the fishing industry. Over one-third of the fish caught in Hong Kong are caught in Aberdeen port.
During the Fishing Moratorium Period (June and July), more than 1,000 fishing vessels are anchored at the Aberdeen Typhoon Shelter.

Boat people in Hong Kong
The people living on boats in Aberdeen are mainly Tanka, a group which arrived in Hong Kong around the 7th to 9th century. The word "Tanka" literally means "egg people," so given because ethnic group paid taxes with eggs instead of money. While the term "Tanka" is used by the boat-dwellers themselves, use by an outsider is considered derogatory. Aside from the Tanka, there is another ethnic group in the floating village called Hoklo who originally came from Fujian province. The Tanka and Hoklo ethnic groups have not always historically been peaceful with each other.

While sometimes referred to as "boat people", they are not related to Vietnamese refugees, also known as boat people, who came to Hong Kong by boat in the 1970s.

The total population of boat dwellers in Hong Kong was estimated at 2,000 in 1841, 150,000 in 1963 and at 40,000 in 1982.

Aberdeen floating village 
Aberdeen's temple to Tin Hau attests to a long tradition of marine and fishing cultures and traditions in Hong Kong. Aberdeen's role as a port emerged between the 14th and 17th centuries when sandalwood (taang heung muk) arrived in junks from Lantau Island and Sha Tin. The waters of Aberdeen served as the intermediary, dispatching the sandalwood into larger boats up the East China coast to major cities in China.

Aberdeen boat people are well known for their floating restaurants which serve fresh seafood caught directly from their own boats. Each floating restaurant serves different types of seafood, each with a unique Cantonese cuisine flavor. Some boat people sell fresh seafood, dried fish and salt fish on their respective boats along the coast.

Dragon Boat Race 
Dragon boat racing in Hong Kong commenced in the 1900s. The Duanwu Festival, taking place on the fifth day of the fifth month of the Lunar calendar is an event of tremendous importance to Hong Kong fishermen. Fishermen believe that rowing dragon boats during the Duanwu festival will bring them luck. Each boat carries with it 48 paddlers. Aberdeen is a pioneer in hosting dragon boat races.

Aberdeen hosts the Dragon Boat race each year.

Lifestyle 

Although Aberdeen has now been transformed into a semi-commercial district, it has maintained the style of a fishing village. Some of the residents actively engage in boat activities and mainly rely on the boat for daily living. Some common boat people activities include fish salt-processing, washing fish and driving, and serving as tour guides on the sightseeing sampans on the waterfront.

Boat restaurants 

Some boat people are employed at the boat restaurants which sell fresh seafood mainly to tourists. The chefs in the restaurants use traditional methods of cooking fresh seafood to provide tourists with a taste of Aberdeen.

Sightseeing sampans 

Some boat people drive and serve as tour guides for sightseeing sampans on the waterfront. When people are walking along the shore, the boat people invite them for boat travel to some small islands nearby or the surrounding area for 20 to 30 minutes. The tour guides introduce the scenic and special points of those areas to the tourists during the ride. The ride costs $50 to $80 Hong Kong dollars.

Fish catching 
At least once a day, boat people drive their boats out to the surrounding areas to catch fish. The catch is handed over to the wholesalers in the Fish Marketing Organization (F.M.O) for further wholesaling, or simply sold directly to wet markets or seafood restaurants.

Non-boat people 
There are many other people in Aberdeen who neither live nor work on boats. Most of these people consume fresh seafood from small-scale fish boats, or go to seafood restaurants to dine. There are two famous floating restaurants in Aberdeen: the Jumbo Floating Restaurant and the Tai Pak Floating Restaurant. In addition to restaurant-going, non-boat people also go to the marine parks at the waterfront to exercise and socialize.

Methods 
Trawling is the most common method used by the fishermen in the South and East China seas. The type of trawling method used depends on which type of fish the fisherman intends to catch.

For the gill-netting operation, the fish boat pulls a long net at its rear. For the seine fishing operation, fishermen place a rounded net into the sea when they see a school of fish swim by. The long-lining operation consists of the fish boat pulling a string, tagged with little fish, to attract and lure the fish into the string.

To catch shrimp, fishermen use the shrimp trawling operation, during which they throw small bags into the sea to catch shrimp.

Fishing junks 
Shrimp trawlers are used to catch shrimp using the shrimp-trawling method. However, shrimp trawlers account for a very small portion of trawlers in Hong Kong. Currently, the most common trawlers in Hong Kong are the Hang Trawlers, Sten Trawlers, Purse Seniers and Gill-Netters. All of these local fishing boat junks were mechanized after the Pacific War.

The Fish Marketing Organization 

The Fish Marketing Organization (F.M.O) is a self-financed, non-profit organization that provides marketing services to fishermen and fish retailers at the Aberdeen floating village. F.M.O's income derives from the commission on sales and surplus earnings. F.M.O's earnings are used to improve the facilities of the Aberdeen Floating Village.
Wholesale fish markets operated by the F.M.O are located along the Aberdeen Promenade.

Fish ball noodles 

Every morning the Aberdeen boat people catch fresh fish to make fish balls. These fish balls are used to create the local Aberdeen specialty, "Fish Ball Noodles". Boat people use traditional and other unique ways of cooking the fish ball noodles. Every evening at 6, people from all over Hong Kong come and visit the village to enjoy the delicacy.

Tourism 
The fishing port of Aberdeen has been a major tourist attraction to the local population and tourists alike due its scenery and seafood. The Hong Kong Tourist Association and the government of Hong Kong have been active in promoting Aberdeen, which benefits the catering and travel industries in the area.

Ferries and sampans 
Along the Aberdeen Promenade, there are multiple ferryboats and a lead-way to Ap Lei Chau, Lamma and Po Toi. There are also a series of shuttle ferries to the Jumbo Floating Restaurant and sampans for hire for sightseeing activities.

Gallery

Jumbo Floating Restaurant 

The Jumbo Floating Restaurant was one of the most prominent tourist attractions in Aberdeen. It was a double-story boat, which serves Cantonese–style cooked seafood on board. The Jumbo Floating Restaurant was popular to mostly tourists and locals who bring their overseas business clients and foreign friends for a taste of traditional Hong Kong life.

The Sampans of Aberdeen 
Although now Aberdeen has been transformed into a semi-commercial district, it has still maintained the style of a fishing village.
Riding traditional sampans to cruise around the typhoon shelter or to cross the waters to Ap Lei Chau is a popular activity for tourists. The sampans to Ap Lei Chau are provided with the Octopus Card (the multi-purpose store valued smart card system in Hong Kong).

Aberdeen Country Park 
The Aberdeen Country Park is built around the reservoirs on the southern side of Hong Kong. The Aberdeen Country Park contains leisure trails and promenades. The longest trail can be completed within an hour. The Hong Kong Tourist Association has established an information center in the park’s southern section for the documentation of informative pamphlets, further contributing to the educational sector of the park.

Aberdeen Tin Hau Temple 
The Tin Hau Temple in Aberdeen was founded in 1851, and it serves the purpose of worshipping Goddess Tin Hau. Every April (23rd day of third lunar month), the temple flourishes with ceremonies for the purpose of celebrating Tin Hau's birthday. During the ceremony, people decorate their boats on the Aberdeen shores and lion dances are performed outside the temple.

See also
 Yau Ma Tei boat people

References 

Aberdeen, Hong Kong